Hermann Strasburger (21 June 1909 – 4 April 1985) was a German ancient historian. 
He was the son of the internist Julius Strasburger and grandson of the botanist Eduard Strasburger.

References 
https://www.deutsche-biographie.de/gnd117307572.html#ndbcontent

1909 births
1985 deaths
Corresponding Fellows of the British Academy